Xanthostege is a genus of moths of the family Crambidae. The genus was erected by Eugene G. Munroe in 1976.

Species
Xanthostege plana Grote, 1883
Xanthostege roseiterminalis (Barnes & McDunnough, 1914)

References

Pyraustinae
Taxa named by Eugene G. Munroe
Crambidae genera
Monotypic moth genera